Celebrate Brooklyn! is one of New York City’s longest-running, free, outdoor performing arts festivals. Launched in 1979 by the then Fund for the Borough of Brooklyn, as a catalyst for Brooklyn's performing arts scene and to bring people back into Prospect Park after years of neglect, Celebrate Brooklyn was an anchor in the park's revitalization and has become one of the city's foremost summer cultural attractions. Over the course of its history, the festival has presented over 2,000 artists and ensembles reflective of the borough's diversity, ranging from internationally acclaimed performers to emerging, cutting-edge artists. The festival attracts upwards of 250,000 attendees from across New York City to the Prospect Park Bandshell each summer. The festival is produced by BRIC, an organization that presents contemporary art, performing arts, and media programs throughout Brooklyn.  

Celebrate Brooklyn's music programming features established and emerging artists in a large and adventurous array of styles and genres ranging from regional American roots music, extremely varied world-music, classical and new music, jazz, pop and alt-rock, and hip-hop. Performers who have appeared at Celebrate Brooklyn! include:

Angelique Kidjo
Baaba Maal
Bilal (Summer 2005, performed "All for Love" from Love for Sale)
Bill T. Jones/Arnie Zane Dance Group
Blue Man Group
Brooklyn Philharmonic
Bob Dylan
Café Tacuba
Carl Hancock Rux
David Van Tieghem
Dr. John
Elizabeth Streb
Fabulous Five Inc.
Hugh Masekela
Joan Armatrading
Ladysmith Black Mambazo
Leela James
Lincoln Center Jazz Orchestra
Maceo Parker
Mark Morris Dance Group
Noche Flamenca
Norah Jones
Philadanco
Philip Glass
Richard Thompson
Savion Glover
Sharon Jones & The Dap-Kings
Talib Kweli
The National
The Neville Brothers
They Might Be Giants

External links

 Review
 For the history of Celebrate Brooklyn, see About Celebrate Brooklyn

References

Music festivals in New York City
Culture of Brooklyn